Belovar is a settlement (naselje) located within the Sesvete city district of Zagreb, the capital of Croatia. According to the 2011 census, the settlement has 378 inhabitants.

References 

Populated places in the City of Zagreb